Naches Peak is a 6,452-foot (1,967 m) mountain summit located on the shared border of Mount Rainier National Park and William O. Douglas Wilderness. It is also on the shared border of Pierce County and Yakima County in Washington state. Naches Peak is situated on the crest of the Cascade Range and immediately southeast of Chinook Pass. Its nearest higher neighbor is Tahtlum Peak,  to the east. The name Naches Peak was proposed by the Yakima Chamber of Commerce and approved by Asahel Curtis in 1927. The Naches Peak Loop Trail is a popular 3.5 mile trail encircling the peak. Precipitation runoff from the west side of Naches Peak drains into Chinook Creek, which is a tributary of the Ohanapecosh River, whereas the east side drains into tributaries of the American River.

Climate
Naches Peak is located in the marine west coast climate zone of western North America. Most weather fronts originate in the Pacific Ocean, and travel northeast toward the Cascade Mountains. As fronts approach, they are forced upward by the peaks of the Cascade Range (Orographic lift), causing them to drop their moisture in the form of rain or snowfall onto the Cascades. As a result, the west side of the Cascades experiences high precipitation, especially during the winter months in the form of snowfall. Because of maritime influence, snow tends to be wet and heavy, resulting in high avalanche danger. During winter months, weather is usually cloudy, but, due to high pressure systems over the Pacific Ocean that intensify during summer months, there is often little or no cloud cover during the summer. The months July through September offer the most favorable weather for viewing or climbing this peak.

See also
 Geology of the Pacific Northwest

Gallery

References

External links
 Naches Peak weather forecast
 National Park Service web site: Mount Rainier National Park
 National Forest Service web site: William O Douglas Wilderness

Cascade Range
Mountains of Pierce County, Washington
Mountains of Washington (state)
Mountains of Yakima County, Washington
North American 1000 m summits